Segundo Manuel Matamba Cabezas (born May 19, 1976) is an Ecuadorian footballer who plays for Barcelona and the Ecuador national team. He is known as one of the top defenders in the domestic tournament.

Club career
Matamba started out as a Barcelona Sporting Club youth product, but got very little playing time in the beginning. In 1999, he got the opportunity to start in the primary team.
Matamba has played in top clubs in Ecuador like, Deportivo Cuenca, Macará, Deportivo Quito. In 2008 Matamba returned to play for the team that gave him that opportunity to play in the majors, Barcelona.

References

External links

bsc.ec

1976 births
Living people
Sportspeople from Guayaquil
Association football defenders
Ecuadorian footballers
Barcelona S.C. footballers
S.D. Aucas footballers
C.D. Cuenca footballers
Delfín S.C. footballers
C.S.D. Macará footballers
S.D. Quito footballers
Ecuador international footballers